Pikelinia is a genus of South American crevice weavers that was first described by Cândido Firmino de Mello-Leitão in 1946.

Species
 it contains 19 species:
Pikelinia aikewara (Brescovit, Magalhaes & Cizauskas, 2016) – Brazil
Pikelinia arenicola Lise, Ferreira & Silva, 2010 – Brazil
Pikelinia brevipes (Keyserling, 1883) – Peru
Pikelinia carajas (Brescovit, Magalhaes & Cizauskas, 2016) – Brazil
Pikelinia colloncura Ramírez & Grismado, 1997 – Argentina
Pikelinia fasciata (Banks, 1902) – Ecuador (Galapagos Is.)
Pikelinia jaminawa (Grismado & Ramírez, 2000) – Peru, Bolivia, Brazil
Pikelinia kiliani Müller, 1987 – Colombia
Pikelinia kolla Ramírez & Grismado, 1997 – Argentina
Pikelinia mahuell Ramírez & Grismado, 1997 – Argentina
Pikelinia mendensis (Mello-Leitão, 1920) – Brazil, Paraguay, Argentina
Pikelinia milloti (Zapfe, 1961) – Chile
Pikelinia pallida (Brescovit, Magalhaes & Cizauskas, 2016) – Brazil
Pikelinia patagonica (Mello-Leitão, 1938) – Argentina
Pikelinia puna Ramírez & Grismado, 1997 – Argentina
Pikelinia roigi Ramírez & Grismado, 1997 – Argentina
Pikelinia tambilloi (Mello-Leitão, 1941) (type) – Argentina
Pikelinia ticucho Ramírez & Grismado, 1997 – Argentina
Pikelinia uspallata Grismado, 2003 – Argentina

References

Araneomorphae genera
Filistatidae
Spiders of South America
Taxa named by Cândido Firmino de Mello-Leitão